Phil Atherton is an English male curler. He won the English Curling Association's Men's Championship in 1992, 1993, 1994, 1995 and 1998.

Teams

References

External links

Living people
English male curlers
English curling champions
Year of birth missing (living people)
Place of birth missing (living people)